Miss Nightingale - The Musical is a musical written by writer and composer Matthew Bugg and produced by his own production company, Mister Bugg Presents. The musical is set in London 1942 and tells the story of nurse turned singer, Maggie Brown, her transformation into the eponymous 'Miss Nightingale' and relationship with the three men in her life and their relationships with one another.

Plot 
The story takes place in London, 1942. Maggie Brown is a northern working class nurse with dreams of becoming a singer. She lives in an East End bedsit with her best friend George Nowodny, a songwriter and Jewish refugee from Nazi-occupied Berlin. The two were introduced by Maggie's brother Bill (who is now dead.) However, what Maggie doesn't know is that George is gay and was her brother's lover. As a refugee and foreigner George struggles to find gainful employment and starts doing rent on the streets to make ends meet. Maggie's boyfriend, Tom, is a Black Market wide boy who fixes himself up as Maggie and George's agent. He manages to get them an audition at a new night club owned by Sir Frank Worthington-Blythe, a wealthy socialite who was invalided out of the RAF after being awarded for bravery. Sir Frank is also deeply closeted. The audition goes well and Sir Frank is impressed by Maggie's voice and George's satirical and saucy song writing talents. A successful new partnership begin and Maggie is transformed into the sexy, saucy and sassy ‘Miss Nightingale’ becoming London's brightest West End star. Sir Frank and George begin a secret love affair. As Miss Nightingale's success grows, the three decide they no longer need Tom. In his anger, and having discovered Sir Frank and George's secret, Tom soon turns to blackmail to get his revenge. At a time when homosexuality was illegal, Sir Frank will do almost anything to avoid discovery.

Productions 
A chamber version of the musical premiered at the Lowry Studio in Salford, Greater Manchester in January 2011 before transferring to the King's Head Theatre in London for 4 weeks. A full-scale re-worked version of the musical was staged in 2013 and toured the UK for three months. The musical mounted subsequent productions for UK tours in 2014, 2015 and 2016. In 2017, a London season was mounted at The Vaults, Waterloo. The musical transferred to The Hippodrome Casino for its West End premiere in March 2018.

Reception 
Reviews for the King's Head Theatre production in 2011 were critical of the musical's dialogue while generally positive about the songs. Charles Spencer, writing in the Daily Telegraph of the 2011 performance, was critical of the script and called it a "deeply flawed production" While Michale Billington in the Guardian gave it two out of five stars, saying that "Bugg's songs are better than his book." Paul Vale, writing for The Stage, wrote that "Bugg’s music and lyrics are strong but his direction lacks perspective"

Reviews for the subsequent re-worked full-scale versions of the musical have been far more positive. West End Wilma gave the show five out of five stars, describing it as “a brilliantly well written show, with a hilarious script and wonderful songs. The serious subject matter is perfectly balanced with hilarious comedy.” Libby Purves, writing in Theatre Cat, gave the production four out of five stars, describing Bugg's songs as "wonderful". Writing for Psychologies Magazine, Danielle Woodward, described Miss Nightingale as "an entertaining night out at the theatre" saying "the show holds your interest and attention from beginning to end, there are laughs and tears, great choreography and costumes." Chris Selman, writing in Gay Times, gave the show four out of five stars calling it “a really great night out" with "wonderful performances, brilliant songs and a wickedly funny sense of humour."

A poll in 2016 organised by BritishTheatre.com to find The 100 Greatest Musicals of All Time saw Miss Nightingale - the musical voted in at number 80 by members of the public. BritishTheatre.com Editor-in-chief Douglas Mayo said, "One of the great things that happen when you open a vote like this to the public is that you find out about a musical like Miss Nightingale. Written by composer Matthew Bugg, and has toured the UK receiving critical acclaim and raves from audiences." The show was also included in the Guardian Readers' favourite stage shows of 2016] for the performances at Theatre Royal, Margate. It was nominated by Guardian reader Philip Bray who described it as, "A touching tale, beautifully and originally told. Being a musical not based on a book or a film, or a film of a book, made it even more captivating."

References

External links
 

2011 musicals
Original musicals
British musicals